Tomáš Indruch (born 10 May 1976 in Hradec Králové) is a Czech slalom canoeist who competed at the international level from 1994 to 2012.

He won five medals in the C1 team event at the ICF Canoe Slalom World Championships with a silver (2006) and four bronzes (2003, 2005, 2007, 2011). He also won eight medals at the European Championships (3 golds, 1 silver and 4 bronzes).

Indruch also competed in two Summer Olympics, earning his best finish of fifth in the C1 event in Athens in 2004.

World Cup individual podiums

1 European Championship counting for World Cup points

References

1976 births
Living people
Czech male canoeists
Canoeists at the 2000 Summer Olympics
Canoeists at the 2004 Summer Olympics
Olympic canoeists of the Czech Republic
Medalists at the ICF Canoe Slalom World Championships
Sportspeople from Hradec Králové